Maria Sołtan (24 February 1921 – 24 July 2001) was a Polish fencer. She competed in the women's individual foil event at the 1952 Summer Olympics.

References

1921 births
2001 deaths
Polish female fencers
Olympic fencers of Poland
Fencers at the 1952 Summer Olympics
Sportspeople from Kraków
20th-century Polish women